Super Brand Mall (Chinese: 正大广场; pinyin: Zhèngdà Guǎngcháng) is a major Shanghainese shopping center. Set in the prime location of Lujiazui Finance and Trade Zone, Super Brand Mall has views of Shanghai's famous Bund. The mall has received ISO9001 certification since 2004.

See also 

 List of shopping malls in China

References 

Shopping malls in Shanghai
Shopping malls established in 2002